Malá Bystřice is a municipality and village in Vsetín District in the Zlín Region of the Czech Republic. It has about 300 inhabitants.

History
Bystřice was established from scattered homesteads in 1620. Since 1629 they have been distinguished separately Malá Bystřice and Velká Bystřice (today Valašská Bystřice).

References

Villages in Vsetín District
Moravian Wallachia